Plasmodium marginatum is a parasite of the genus Plasmodium subgenus Sauramoeba. As in all Plasmodium species, P. marginatum has both vertebrate and insect hosts. The vertebrate hosts for this parasite are reptiles.

Taxonomy 
The parasite was first described by Telford in 1979. This species had previously been considered to be Plasmodium tropiduri.

Description 
All stages tend to lie along the erythrocyte margin.

While mature schizonts appear to be like flattened fans with 3 to 8 merozoites, immature schizonts are highly amoeboid.

Gametocytes are smaller than erythrocyte nuclei.

Distribution 
This species is found in Central America and South America.

Hosts 
The only known host is the anole lizard Anolis frenatus.

References 

marginatum